Herbert Francis Kennedy (21 February 1877 – 23 March 1951) was an Australian rules footballer who played with St Kilda in the Victorian Football League (VFL).

References

External links 

1877 births
1951 deaths
Australian rules footballers from Victoria (Australia)
St Kilda Football Club players